Parkview Secondary School was located at 60 Balsam Avenue Hamilton, Ontario, and was a member of the Hamilton-Wentworth District School Board. Parkview Secondary School had a 2009–2010 enrollment of 333. The school's mission statement was "Educating students to become lifelong learners and contributing citizens in a challenging, changing, multi-cultural world". Parkview Secondary School used the Ontario Secondary School Literacy Test (OSSLT) to assess Grade 10 students' skills in reading and writing. Successful completion of the test is one of 32 requirements students need to attain in order to receive an Ontario Secondary School Diploma. The school offered special education classes and it has an ESL program. It had also run a credit granting Vocational Pathways Program that prepared student for the transition to the workplace. The school was closed at the end of June 2014, with all students relocating to Delta Secondary or Mountain Secondary, and as of late 2014, the school has been demolished to make room for parking for Hamilton's newly reconstructed football stadium.

Program highlights and student support programs
Parkview Secondary School takes part in the following programs:
 Food and Catering Program
 Cosmetology Program
 Remedial English and Math Programs
 Technical Programs (Auto, Wood, Home repair)
 Conservatory NNECT Project
 Panther of the month
 Student Success room & staff
 Learning Resource room & staff
 Peer tutoring
 Health Initiatives for Youth (HIFY)
 Alternatives for Youth (AY)

Clubs
Parkview Secondary School offered the following clubs:
 Science Club
 Checkers and Chess
 Anime Club
 Ball Hockey
 Yoga
 Breakfast Club
 Free lunch program
 Walk-In Closet
 Football
 Hockey
 Annual Christmas Store
 Drive to Success Program
 OSSLT

Environmental focus
Parkview Secondary School was active in the following Parkview environmental initiatives:
 Improvement of Physical Plant
 Actively review, update and implement the Safe school plan
 Improve attendance and punctuality

See also
List of high schools in Ontario

External links
Parkview Secondary School profile

High schools in Hamilton, Ontario
Educational institutions in Canada with year of establishment missing
Educational institutions disestablished in 2014
2014 disestablishments in Ontario